Neurosis & Jarboe is a collaboration between Californian avant-garde metal band Neurosis and singer-songwriter Jarboe formerly of Swans. It was released on October 21, 2003 by Neurot Recordings. On August 2, 2019, the album was re-released on Neurot Recordings. The 2019 version was remastered by Bob Weston (of Shellac) with new artwork by Aaron Turner.

Accolades

Track listing

Production
Adapted from the Neurosis & Jarboe liner notes.

Musicians
 Dave Edwardson – instruments, effects, recording
 Jarboe – lead vocals, instruments, effects
 Scott Kelly – instruments, effects
 Noah Landis – instruments, effects, recording
 Jason Roeder – instruments, effects
 Steve Von Till – instruments, effects, recording

Production and additional personnel
 Jeff Byrd – recording
 William Faith – recording (1–4, 6–8)
 Chris Griffin – recording (5)
 Neurosis – mixing
 Desmond Shea – recording
 Tankpictures / Discreetcases;– art direction, design
 Cedric Victor cover art

Release history

References

External links 
 

2003 albums
Collaborative albums
Neurosis (band) albums
Jarboe albums
Neurot Recordings albums